Gary White (born 16 June 1985 in Coventry, England) is a triple jumper. He was the 2007 European under-23 champion. He is also an under-23 AAA Champion. White attended University of Wales Institute, Cardiff. He competes for Cardiff AAC, his personal best triple jump is 16.33 metres.

References

External links

1985 births
Living people
People from Skegness
British male triple jumpers
English male triple jumpers
Alumni of Cardiff Metropolitan University